Limnonectes kenepaiensis is a species of frog in the family Dicroglossidae. It is endemic to western Borneo and occurs in both Kalimantan (Indonesia) and Sarawak (Malaysia), and perhaps in Sabah (Malaysia). Common name Kenepai wart frog has been coined for it. It was first described as subspecies of Limnonectes paramacrodon, which it resembles.

Description
The head is longer than it is broad. The snout is obtusely pointed. The tympanum is distinct. The toes are webbed. Skin texture is rough. The male has vocal sacs.

Habitat and conservation
Limnonectes kenepaiensis is known from lowland dipterocarp forests and peat swamp forests at elevations below . Breeding probably takes place in water. It is a rare species that is threatened by clear-cutting of lowland tropical rainforests. It is present in the Kubah National Park in Sarawak.

References

kenepaiensis
Endemic fauna of Borneo
Amphibians of Indonesia
Amphibians of Malaysia
Taxa named by Robert F. Inger
Amphibians described in 1966
Taxonomy articles created by Polbot
Amphibians of Borneo